Mercury is an online quarterly science magazine that features articles and columns about astronomy for a general audience published by the Astronomical Society of the Pacific (ASP) for its members.

History
The first issue of Mercury was published in January 1972 as a bimonthly popular journal to boost public understanding of astronomy and act as a science communication platform to interpret the results of astronomical research for the nonspecialist. In 2007, the magazine was offered in printed and digital form, transitioning to all-digital the following year. Mercury continues as an ASP members-only digital publication and, as of 2019, the publicly-accessible Mercury Online companion blog was launched, featuring articles from the Mercury archives.

Editors of Mercury over the years include Leon Salanave, Richard Reis, Andrew Fraknoi, Sally Stephens, James White III, George Musser, Robert Naeye, Paul Deans, Ian O'Neill, and Liz Kruesi.

Mercury has its headquarters in San Francisco. Contributors include (as of 2019):  Jennifer Birriel, Clifford Cunningham, Matthew R. Francis, C. Renee James, Brian Kruse, Arianna Long, Jason Major, Steve Murray, James Negus, M. Katy Rodriguez Wimberly, Linda Shore, Tracy Staedter, Christopher Wanjek.

References

External links
Mercury magazine homepage

Online magazines published in the United States
Quarterly magazines published in the United States
Science and technology magazines published in the United States
Astronomy magazines
Defunct magazines published in the United States
Magazines established in 1972
Magazines disestablished in 2008
Magazines published in San Francisco
Online magazines with defunct print editions